The 2014–15 season was Iraklis third consecutive season in the Football League and fourth overall. In the league the club finished first in the North Group and gained entrance to the promotion playoffs. In the playoffs, Iraklis finished in the second position, gaining promotion to the Super League, after 4 years in the lower divisions. In the Greek Cup Iraklis was eliminated by Skoda Xanthi in the semi-finals.

Giannis Loukinas was Iraklis' topscorer in the league and overall, with 15 goals. Diego Romano and Pavlos Kyriakidis led the club's scoring in the cup, with 2 goals each. Huanderson had the most league appearances for Iraklis, starting all 32 league matches he played. Diego Romano and Nikos Pourtoulidis played in all 11 cup matches of the club. Huanderson and Pourtoulidis were tied for most overall appearances in the season, making 41 each.

Players

First team

Transfers

In

Summer

Winter

Out

Summer

Winter

Club

Coaching staff

Other information

Kit

|
|
|

Pre-season and friendlies

Football League

League table

Results summary

Results by round

Matches

Promotion play-offs

Matches

Greek Cup

First round

Second Round (Group D)

Third round

Quarter-finals

Semi-finals

Statistics

Appearances and goals

|-
|colspan="14"|Players who left the club in-season

Top scorers

Includes all competitive matches. The list is sorted by shirt number when total goals are equal.

Top assists

Includes all competitive matches. The list is sorted by shirt number when total assists are equal.

Disciplinary record

Includes all competitive matches. The list is sorted by shirt number when total cards are equal.

References

Iraklis Thessaloniki F.C. seasons
Iraklis F.C.